Christopher John Dahl (8 December 1898, Oslo – 26 December 1966, Oslo) was a Norwegian sailor who competed in the 1924 Summer Olympics. In 1924 he won the gold medal as crew member of the Norwegian boat Elisabeth V in the 6 metre class event.

References

External links
profile

1898 births
1966 deaths
Norwegian male sailors (sport)
Olympic sailors of Norway
Sailors at the 1924 Summer Olympics – 6 Metre
Olympic gold medalists for Norway
Olympic medalists in sailing
Sportspeople from Oslo
Medalists at the 1924 Summer Olympics